William Joseph Miller (born April 17, 1940) is a former professional American football wide receiver in the American Football League (AFL). He played six seasons for the Dallas Texans (1962), the Buffalo Bills (1963), and the Oakland Raiders (1964–1968).

Early life and education
Miller was born in McKeesport, Pennsylvania on April 17, 1940. He attended the University of Miami, where he played college football for the Miami Hurricanes. At the University of Miami, he was a member of the Lambda Chi Alpha fraternity.

Professional football
Miller launched his professional football career with the Dallas Texans in 1962. 

Miller played in 66 games in his career, garnering 141 receptions for 1,879 yards and 10 touchdowns. In five career playoff games, he caught 9 passes for 121 yards and three touchdowns. Miller was 4th in receptions in 1963 with 69 catches, while being 7th in receiving yards with 860 and 8th in receiving yards per game at 61.4. He was named to the 2nd Team in the All-AFL level by the Associated Press that year. Miller caught two touchdown passes in Super Bowl II in 1969, the only scores from quarterback Daryle Lamonica in the Oakland Raiders' 33-14 loss to the Green Bay Packers. Miller's five catches led all receivers in the game.

Post-NFL life
After he retired, Miller served as an assistant coach for the Buffalo Bills for three seasons. He also worked at Hutchinson Central Technical High School as a substitute teacher. He started up a sports bar and later an exotic dance club in Miami called the Bird's Nest for several years. He is on the list of retired players that will receive brain testing for Alzheimer's disease, memory loss or dementia as part of the NFL plan to address injuries linked to concussions. He now resides in St. Augustine, Florida.

See also
 List of American Football League players

References

1940 births
Living people
American football wide receivers
Buffalo Bills players
Dallas Texans (AFL) players
Miami Hurricanes football players
Oakland Raiders players
All-American college football players
Sportspeople from McKeesport, Pennsylvania
Players of American football from Pennsylvania
American Football League players